Valerie Garnier (born 9 January 1965) is a French basketball coach for French national team, which participated at the 2014 FIBA World Championship.

She was a French basketball player. She has coached French basketball teams since 1995 and France's women's national basketball team since 2013.

References

1965 births
Living people
People from Cholet
French women's basketball coaches
Sportspeople from Maine-et-Loire
Chevaliers of the Légion d'honneur
French Olympic coaches